Siddiqi is a Muslim family name, found in the Horn of Africa, the Middle East and South Asia. Sheikh is an additional title used occasionally by Siddiqis to signify noble Arab heritage. According to tradition, people having surname "Siddiqi" are offspring of Abu Bakr Siddique, the first Khalifa (Caliph) and an early companion and friend of the Islamic prophet, Muhammad.

Distribution
People claiming Siddiqi descent can be found in Djibouti, Eritrea, Somalia, Somaliland and Ethiopia.

However, representatives in these countries are not referred to as Siddiqi, but are instead known by various local names. Siddiqis in Eastern Ethiopia are usually called Qallu. While some of them still speak Arabic, most of them speak the regional Oromo, Harari or Somali languages, tongues which, like Arabic, also belong to the Afro-Asiatic language family. In Somalia, Siddiqis are commonly known as Sheekhaal or Aw Qutub.

Divisions
Notable Siddiqi families in the Horn region include:

1. Kurtu family (in Harar, Dader and Djibouti)

2. Abogn family (through the Khalaf and Kurtu families; Harari genealogy)

3. Shadir family (through the Aw Umar Ziad family; Harari genealogy)

4. Aw Barre family

5. Aw Ismael family

6. Qallu-Diinii family

7. Khabir Hassan family (in Galamso)

8. Aw Samirren family

9. Aw Khalaf family

10. Aw Umar Ziad family

Common ancestor
The Muslim cleric Sheikh Abadir Umar Ar-Rida (Abadir Umar Al-Rida ibn Muhammad ibn Shamsadin Al-Bakri Al-Siddiqi) is traditionally regarded as the common ancestor of the Siddiqi families in the Horn region. Ar-Rida is the main figure in the Fath Madinat Harar, an unpublished history of the city of Harar in the 13th century. According to the account, Ar-Rida, along with several other saints, came from the Hijaz region of present-day Saudi Arabia to Harar in 612H (1216 AD). The Sheikh is said to have then fathered six sons, whom the Siddiqis regard as their forebears.

Sheikh Ar-Rida's tomb is located inside the walled city. A few meters away, there is also a mosque that bears his name.

Notable Siddiqis
Notable Siddiqis include:

Ahmad Taqi in Ethiopia.
Dr. Ali Sheikh Ahmed, the founder and president of Mogadishu University in Mogadishu, Somalia. He is also president of Al-Islaah, which is part of the wider Muslim Brotherhood organization based in Egypt.
Dr Ibrahim Dusuuqi, Muslim cleric in Somalia and former member of the Transitional National Government.
Sheikh Ahmad Qudubi, Mogadishu-based scholar and preacher.

See also
 Sheekhal clan
 Siddiqui

Notes

References
Shaikh Siddiqui

Islamic culture
Muslim communities in Africa
Oromo groups
Ethnic groups in Somalia
Ethnic groups in Djibouti
Surnames
Somali people of Arab descent